Bangkok Asian Games may refer to four different Asian Games held in Bangkok:

 1966 Asian Games
 1970 Asian Games
 1978 Asian Games
 1998 Asian Games